Abdi Ismail Samatar (born 1950) is a Somali scholar, writer and professor of geography.

Personal life
Samatar was born in 1956 in Gabiley in Somaliland. He is the brother of scholar and politician Ahmed Ismail Samatar.

For his tertiary education, Samatar earned an A.B. from the University of Wisconsin–La Crosse in 1979. He later obtained a MCRP in Urban/Regional Planning from the Iowa State University in 1981. In 1985, he completed a PhD from the University of California, Berkeley.

Samatar is Muslim.

Career
Between the late 1980s and early 1990s, Samatar was a lecturer at the University of Iowa. He later joined the University of Minnesota's faculty, serving as a professor of geography and chair of the institution's geography department.

He has authored several books centered on democracy and development in the Horn of Africa and the developing world. In 2000, his non-fiction work An African Miracle was a finalist for the year's Herskovits Prize.

In Spring 2003, Samatar was the Chair of the Harmonization Committee of the Somali Charter: Somali Reconciliation – Independent Committee.

In 2013–2014, he also served as the President of the African Studies Association. Additionally, he has been a frequent guest or contributor at various international media outlets, including Voice of America, PBS, Al Jazeera, the BBC, Radio France International, Australian Broadcasting Corporation, TV Channel 5 and Somali TV Minneapolis.

On January 30 he was appointed to leader of the election commission to oversee the integrity of the Somalia presidential elections that were held 8 February 2017.

Awards
Samatar has received various awards for his work, including:
University of Minnesota President's Award for Service, 2018
University of Minnesota Somali Student Association Award, 2017
University of Minnesota Outstanding Community Service Award, 2004
Finalist, Herskovits Award of the African Studies Association for An African Miracle, 2000
Fulbright Scholar Award, 1993/4 and 1999
Design Achievement Award in recognition for substantial contribution to the field of Community and Regional Planning, Iowa State University, October 20, 2000
Certificate of Recognition for Outstanding Teaching and Leadership in Community-University Collaboration, University of Minnesota, 1997
Collegiate Teaching Award, University of Iowa, 1989–90

Professional memberships
Samatar's professional memberships include:
Editorial Board, African Geographic Review Journal
Editorial Board, Bildan: Somali Studies Journal
Member, board of directors of African Studies Association, 2002–2004
President of African Studies Association, 2013–2014
Committee member, MacArthur Compton Fellowships
Graduate Education Policy

Selected works
Africa’s First Democrats: Somalia’s Aden A. Osman and Abdirazak H. Hussen.  Abdi Ismail Samatar, 2016
The African State: Reconsideration. Samatar, Abdi, Ahmed Samatar, Co-Editor, 2002.
An African Miracle: State and Class Leadership and Colonial Legacy in Botswana. Samatar, Abdi, Heinemann, 1999.
"The Dialectics of Piracy in Somalia: the Poor versus the Rich". Samatar, Abdi, Third World Quarterly, December 2010.
"Faithless Power as Fraticide: Is there an Alternative in Somalia?" Samatar, Abdi, International Journal of Somali Studies, 9 63–81, 2009.
"Back to the Future". Samatar, Abdi, BBC Focus on Africa Magazine, July–September 34–5, 2008.
"Debating Somali Identity in a British Tribunal". The BBC Somali Service. Samatar, Abdi, Author, 2007.
"The Islamic Courts and the Mogadishu Miracle: What comes Next for Somalia". Samatar, Abdi, Review of African political Economy, Fall 2006.
"The Ethiopian Election of 2005: A Bombshell & Turning Point". Samatar, Abdi, Review of African Political Economy, 104/5, 2005.
Ethiopian Federalism: Autonomy versus Control in the Somali Region. Samatar, Abdi, Author, 2004.
Editorial of Somali Reconciliation. Samatar, Abdi, Ahmed Samatar, 2003.
Somalis as Africa's First Democrats. Samatar, Abdi, Ahmed Samatar, 2002.
Local Initiatives and Somali Reconstruction. Samatar, Abdi, 2001.
Social Transformation and Islamic Reinterpretation in Northern Somalia: The Women's Mosque in Gabiley. Samatar, Abdi, 2000.
Ethnicity and leadership in the making of African state models: Botswana versus Somalia. Samatar, Abdi, 1997.

References

External links

American foreign policy writers
Somalian non-fiction writers
Somalists
1950 births
Living people
Foreign policy writers
Somalian educators
Somalian historians
American geographers
American people of Somali descent
University of Minnesota faculty
University of Wisconsin–La Crosse alumni
Iowa State University alumni
University of California, Berkeley alumni
20th-century Somalian people
21st-century Somalian people
20th-century American male writers
21st-century American male writers
20th-century geographers
21st-century geographers
20th-century American educators
21st-century American educators
20th-century American non-fiction writers
21st-century American non-fiction writers
American male non-fiction writers
People from Maroodi Jeex
Gadabuursi
Fellows of the African Academy of Sciences